Donald Calloway (born September 18, 1979) is an American attorney and politician from St. Louis, Missouri. He was a Democratic member of the Missouri House of Representatives for the 71st District in St. Louis County.

Early life
Donald Calloway, Jr. was born in St. Louis, Missouri to Donald Calloway, Sr. and Jonell Calloway.  In 2002, he graduated from Alabama A&M University, majoring in Political Science and English.  There, he was initiated in the Gamma Phi chapter of Kappa Alpha Psi and was elected Student Body President.  He then entered law school at Boston University, graduating in 2005.  A practicing attorney, he married Sarah Jane Forman, a law professor at the School of Law at Washington University in St. Louis.  They have two children together.

2008 election 
On August 5, 2008, Calloway won the Democratic primary for the 71st District seat in the Missouri House of Representatives. Calloway won 52% of the vote in a three-way race against Vernon Harlan, and Rogerick Wilson. Since no Republican candidate filed for the office, he was elected unopposed on November 4, 2008. He took office in January 2009.

Representative career
Calloway, as a member of the Missouri House of Representatives, served on the Emerging Issues in Animal Agriculture Committee, General Laws Committee, Rules Committee and Tax Policy Committee.

In October 2009, the Northeast Ambulance and Fire Protection District Board, which had been plagued with charges of corruption, bribery and cronyism, came under direct fire as the board approved an ill-merited severance package for board members Robert Edwards and Joe Washington totaling over $750,000.  Representative Calloway personally challenged the legitimacy of the payoff, and filed a successful lawsuit to have the corresponding bank accounts frozen.

In February 2010, Calloway sponsored a bill to limit the long-term effects of concussions on high-school football athletes.  The bill required that student athletes who suffered a concussion get written permission from a doctor or licensed medical official, certifying the absence of long-term brain damage and the ability to continue playing safely, before they would be allowed to participate in games or practice.

2010 election
Calloway ran unsuccessfully in the Democratic primary for State Senator from the 14th district finishing third behind Maria Chappelle-Nadal (D-72) and Theodore "Ted" Hoskins (D-80), with about 500 votes separating the top 3 candidates.

References

External links 
Don Calloway voter information - League of Women Voters
Election Results - Missouri 2008 - The Council of State Governments
Don Calloway's Official Website
Don Calloway's Missouri House Page

1979 births
Living people
Alabama A&M University alumni
Boston University School of Law alumni
Democratic Party members of the Missouri House of Representatives
Missouri lawyers
Politicians from St. Louis